The Bridal Path is a 1959 British comedy film directed by Frank Launder and starring Bill Travers, George Cole and Bernadette O'Farrell. It is based on the 1952 novel of the same name by Nigel Tranter.  The film was an unsuccessful attempt to repeat the success of Launder and Gilliat's earlier Geordie (1955).

Cast
 Bill Travers as Ewan McEwan
 George Cole as Police Sergeant Bruce
 Bernadette O'Farrell as Siona Campbell
 Duncan Macrae as Headquarters Police Sergeant
 Alex Mackenzie as Finlay
 Patricia Bredin as Margaret
 Fiona Clyne as Katie
 Dilys Laye as Isobel
 Eddie Byrne as Mike Flanagan
 Terry Scott as Police Constable Donald
 Gordon Jackson as Police Constable Alec
 Roddy McMillan as Murdo
 Joan Benham as Barmaid
 Pekoe Ainley as Craigie
 Joan Fitzpatrick as Sarah
 Nell Ballantyne as Jessie
 Jameson Clark as Police Constable at Crossroads
 Jack Lambert as Hector
 Annette Crosbie as 1st Waitress
 Molly Weir as 2nd waitress
 Graham Crowden as Man Giving Directions to the Beach (uncredited)

Plot
Ewan McEwan, an easy-going sheep and corn farmer on Beigg, a (fictional) Scottish island, is unable to marry his childhood sweetheart Katie as his hell-raising preacher uncle is opposed to consanguinity - all the islanders are related to each other. When Katie leaves for Glasgow to train as a nurse, he is persuaded to find a wife on the mainland (which he has never visited).

Withdrawing 400 pounds from the £800 he has saved in a bank in Oban, he sets out to meet the local girls. He has been advised by the islanders of what they think he should look for in a potential wife: strong legs, wide hips, knowledge of cows and sheep, and also not a "candle burning Catholic" or a Campbell!

His innocent close inspection of the girls he meets raises their suspicions. The first girl, inspired by a lurid paperback novel she is reading thinks he's a white slaver and so informs the local police. He then becomes a wanted fugitive after he 'borrows' a policeman's bicycle. Then he is mistaken for the leader of a gang of salmon poachers who use dynamite. The police eventually arrest the innocent Ewan on a wide variety of charges, but don't believe his story. Held overnight at the local police sergeant's home (there is no jail), he easily escapes custody and resumes his flight, still examining all the girls he meets.

After two sisters that he takes refuge with come to blows over him, he takes their boat (leaving the money agreed upon) and hitches a passage with a fishing boat. The boat is taken over by fishermen from a nearby island who think they are encroaching on their fishing grounds, and Ewan is locked in a shed. He is rescued by a local girl and they row back to Ewan's home island.

By now he's had enough of searching, and is starving, since he hasn't managed to have a square meal whilst on the run. He and Katie decide to marry anyway, despite the ban on consanguinity.

Critical reception
The New York Times wrote, "Bridal Path does not take any unexpected turns but a viewer can have a nice time and some giggles along the way."

Box Office
According to Kinematograph Weekly the film performed "better than average" at the British box office in 1959.

References

External links

1959 films
1959 romantic comedy films
British romantic comedy films
1950s English-language films
English-language Scottish films
Films directed by Sidney Gilliat
Films directed by Frank Launder
Scottish films
Films set in Scotland
1950s British films